Tiruvannamalai Central Bus Station , commonly known as Tiruvannamalai New Bus Stand, is one of the bus termini of Tiruvannamalai. Sister stations include Manalurpet road station and nine other arterial festive time bus stations, which are primarily used for intra-city buses.

Services 
Due to the town's location between Bengaluru and Puducherry & Vellore and Trichy, all Bengaluru bound buses from Villupuram, Cuddalore, Kumbakonam and Thanjavur pass the terminus. The station is managed by Department of Transport (Tamil Nadu). It services premium buses, which are operated by SETC.

Beyond Tamil Nadu

Tiruvannamalai is also serviced by Karnataka and Andhra Pradesh government transport corporations. Karnataka State Road Transport Corporation's Rajahamsa, Airavat and Airavat club class buses and other vehicles connect Tiruvannamalai with rest of Karnataka.

Andhra Pradesh State Road Transport Corporation connects Tiruvannamalai with Tirupathi and Hyderabad.

Connections

Platforms and Busbays

References

External links 
 State Transport Undertakings

Bus stations in Tamil Nadu
Transport in Tiruvannamalai